Deedes is a surname. Notable people with the surname include:

Bill Deedes, KBE, MC, PC, DL (1913–2007), British Conservative Party politician, army officer and journalist
Charles Deedes KCB CMG DSO (1879–1969), senior British Army officer who went on to be Military Secretary
John Deedes (1803–1885), amateur English cricketer
Ralph Bouverie Deedes, K.C.B., O.B.E., M.C. (1890–1954), senior officer in the pre-partition Indian Army
William Deedes junior (1834–1887), English cricketer and a Conservative Party politician
William Deedes senior (born 1796), English cricketer who played first-class cricket from 1817 to 1826, and a Conservative Party politician
Wyndham Deedes CMG DSO (1883–1956), British Brigadier General, Chief secretary to the British High Commissioner of the British Mandate of Palestine

See also
Deeds (disambiguation)

de:Deedes